The South African Journal of Obstetrics and Gynaecology is a biannual peer-reviewed open access medical journal published by the South African Medical Association. It was formerly published as a supplement to the South African Medical Journal.

Abstracting and indexing
The journal is abstracted and indexed in:

References

External links

English-language journals
Obstetrics and gynaecology journals
Creative Commons Attribution-licensed journals
Academic journals published in South Africa
Publications established in 1968
Biannual journals